Emotional Rain is the seventh studio album by singer Lee Aaron, released on August 3, 1994 through A&M Records (Canada) and in 1995 through Koch Entertainment (Europe); it was later reissued in 2004 through Solid Gold Records.

Track listing

Personnel
Lee Aaron – vocals, background vocals, mixing, executive production
John Albani – guitar (except tracks 13, 14), mixing, production
Knox Chandler – guitar (except tracks 13, 14)
Reeves Gabrels – guitar (except tracks 13, 14)
Don Harrison – guitar (tracks 13–14)
Don Short – drums
Daniel Mansilla – additional percussion
Don Binns – bass
Kim Deschamp – mandolin
Billy Newton-Davis – background vocals
Mischke – background vocals
Brad Nelson – engineering, mixing
Mark Berry – engineering, mixing
L. Stu Young – engineering
Graham Brewer – engineering
David Tedesco – engineering
Ray Gilliland – engineering
Keith Stein – engineering
Peter Wonsiak – engineering
Mark S. Berry – mixing, production

References

Lee Aaron albums
1994 albums
A&M Records albums
Albums recorded at Metalworks Studios